The C.H. Yoe High School is a public high school located in Cameron, Texas (USA). Founded in 1921  in honor of donor Charles Yoe, It is part of the Cameron Independent School District located in north central Milam County and classified as a 3A school by the UIL. The school uses the unusual symbol oYe to pay tribute to the school's namesake, C.H. Yoe, the school's founder.  In 2015, the school was rated "Met Standard" by the Texas Education Agency.

History
The C.H. Yoe High School was built in 1921 in honor of local Cameron businessman and entrepreneur Charles H. Yoe, who donated the money for the school. Yoe wanted to donate the money as he felt that his lack of education had handicapped him and the Yoes had no children to inherit their fortune. Plans for the new school, which was to replace the deteriorating Cameron High School, were started in 1916 but halted after Charles' death in 1917. The building was to cost no less than $50,000 and no more than $125,000. The first classes at The C.H. Yoe School were held on March 9, 1921. The building was considered state-of-the-art for its time. In 2004, after 83 years of use, the original school building was discontinued for service after a new school building was built and opened for the 2004-2005 school year. The new school was built around the old school and gymnasium, and both buildings are still standing.

Athletics
The school's athletic teams compete as Cameron rather than C.H. Yoe.

The Cameron Yoemen/Lady Yoe compete in the following sports - 

Cross Country, Volleyball, Football, Basketball, Powerlifting, Soccer, Golf, Tennis, Track & Field, Softball, Baseball, Wrestling

C.H. Yoe High School's principal rival are the Rockdale Tigers, as the schools are about 15 minutes apart, separated by the Little River. The Rockdale Tigers and Cameron Yoemen football teams compete in the "Battle of the Bell" every year for the coveted Victory Bell.

State titles
Lone Star Cup - 
2010-11 (2A)
Baseball - 
2011 (2A)
Football - 
1981 (3A), 2012 (2A DI), 2013 (2A DI), 2014 (3A DI)
Girls Track - 
2011 (2A)
2021 (3A)
Powerlifting
2007: Boys 275 lb. class - Luis Marquez
squat 700, bench 370, deadlift 600
2013, 2014: Girls 198 lb. class -  Jazmine Jones 
Tennis - 
1991, 1992, 1993, 1994: Kori Sosnowy (Girls Singles, 3A)

Band
Marching Band: Bronze 2011
Marching Band: Silver 2013
State (2A) Honor Band 2014 
Marching Band: 6th 2015
Marching Band: 5th 2017
Marching Band: 6th 2019
Marching Band: 8th 2021

Theater
One Act Play  - 
1992(3A)

Notable alumni
Dede Westbrook, wide receiver for the Minnesota Vikings
Drayton McLane, former president and CEO of McLane Company and former owner of the Houston Astros

References

External links
Cameron ISD

Schools in Milam County, Texas
Public high schools in Texas